Reginald Grey, 5th Earl of Kent (before 154117 March 1573) was an English peer.

Biography
He was a son of Henry Grey (1520–1545) and Margaret St John. His paternal grandparents were Henry Grey, 4th Earl of Kent and Anne Blennerhassett.
Reginald Grey was educated at St John's College, Cambridge.

He is mentioned in the Annales Rerum Gestarum Angliae et Hiberniae Regnate Elizabetha by William Camden, in the entry for year 1573:

"18. Not long after dyed also Reginald Grey Earle of Kent, whom the Queene a yeare before had raised from a private man to the honour of Earle of Kent, after that this title had lyen asleepe the space of fifty yeares from the death of Richard Grey Earle of Kent, who had set his Patrimony flying, and was elder Brother to this mans Grandfather. In this honour succeeded unto him Henry his Brother."

This was a reference to the state of the title at this point. His great-uncle Richard Grey, 3rd Earl of Kent had wound up heavily in debt, probably through gambling, and was forced to alienate most of his property. Henry Grey had inherited the claim to the title but little property and lived mostly as a gentleman, a private citizen. Reginald lived the same way until Elizabeth I restored to him his title and part of his property in 1572.

Gray was married to Susan Bertie, daughter of Catherine Willoughby, 12th Baroness Willoughby de Eresby. There were no known children from this marriage. His younger brothers Henry and Charles successively inherited the Kent title.

References

External links
A Grey family pedigree
1573 entry of the Annales of William Camden

16th-century births
1573 deaths
Earls of Kent (1465 creation)
16th-century English nobility
Reginald
Alumni of St John's College, Cambridge
Barons Grey of Ruthin